Tenthwave Digital is a digital agency founded in 2011 as a merger of three other digital agencies. It specializes in social marketing, digital strategy, website design and development, SEO and SEM, digital advertising, promotions, sweepstakes and technology. Its notable clients include PayPal, Time Warner, Duncan Hines, eBay, Google, Facebook, Visa, Pinnacle Foods and Snyder's-Lance.

Campaigns by the agency have included "Stop Bullying, Speak Up" — a global campaign, engineered in partnership with Facebook, Time Warner, and Cartoon Network. The campaign reached over 2 million users and garnered over 150,000 pledges.

Other work has included an "I'm Voting" app for Facebook and CNN to encourage users to commit to voting in the 2012 United States Presidential election, Canadian Club's "Hide A Case Campaign," as well as campaigns for Birds Eye Vegetables and Voss Water.

Additionally, Tenthwave Digital has been a Facebook Preferred Marketing Developer in Applications since 2011.

References

External links
Business Week Company Snapshot

Advertising agencies based in New York City
Digital marketing companies of the United States
Technology companies established in 2011
Internet properties established in 2011